Little Giant is a 1946 American comedy drama film directed by William A. Seiter and starring the comedy team of Abbott and Costello. The film was released in the UK with the title On the Carpet.

Plot
A naïve country boy named Benny Miller, from Cucamonga, California, has been taking correspondence phonograph lessons in salesmanship. Upon completion of the course, he leaves his mother and his girlfriend Martha to pursue a career in Los Angeles.  He arranges a meeting with his Uncle Clarence, a bookkeeper with the Hercules Vacuum Cleaner Company.  When he arrives to ask for a job, the sales manager, Eddie Morrison, mistakes him for one of the auditioning fashion models and has him remove his clothing.  Morrison's secret wife, Hazel Temple, discovers the mistake and suggests that Benny be hired to avoid an accounting scandal, as they have been "cooking the books". Unfortunately, Benny is fired from his salesman post after only one day. Clarence transfers Benny to the company's Stockton branch, which is run by Morrison's cousin, Tom Chandler.

Benny's misfortunes continue, including a prank played on him by his new coworkers when they convince him that he can read minds.  However, the prank gives Benny sufficient confidence to become "Hercules' Salesman of the Year". He is sent back to the Los Angeles branch to receive his award, and while demonstrating his 'abilities' to Morrison, he alludes to the fact that Morrison has a secret bank account. Morrison sends his wife to obtain more information from Benny to determine what he actually knows. Hazel and Benny go to her apartment, where Benny becomes ill after smoking a cigar. Hazel then gives Benny a sedative, but accidentally takes it herself while he falls asleep from the cigar's ill effects. Morrison arrives home to find the two asleep together and fears the worst.

At the awards ceremony that evening, Benny learns of the mind-reading ruse, and overhears Morrison speaking ill of him. Benny returns to his mother and his girlfriend in Cucamonga, where he also encounters Chandler, his coworker Ruby, and the Hercules company president, Mr. Van Loon. They announce that Morrison has been fired, and has been replaced by Chandler. Benny is now sales manager of the Cucamonga district.

Cast

Production
Filming took place between November 1 through December 17, 1945. William A. Seiter was paid $100,000 and the two leads $110,000.

In this film, and the next Abbott and Costello film, The Time of Their Lives (1946), the comedians play separate characters instead of their usual partnership. This was due to falling box-office receipts for the team's releases in 1945, and animosity between both men that actually led them to a short split.
Abbott played a third role in this film as well, that of Chandler's and Morrison's grandmother (only seen in a painting).
The opening scene where Costello is trying to sell Sid Fields more than just the gasoline that he came to buy was originally filmed with another actor, Eddy Waller.

Rerelease
The film was re-released in 1951 along with The Time of Their Lives, and in 1954 along with their first movie,  One Night in the Tropics.

Routines
Abbott and Costello perform the 7x13=28 routine, where Costello attempts to prove to Abbott that 7 times 13 equals 28, 28 divided by 7 equals 13, and seven 13's added together equals 28.

Home media
This film has been released twice on DVD.  The first time, on The Best of Abbott and Costello Volume Two, on May 4, 2004, and again on October 28, 2008 as part of Abbott and Costello: The Complete Universal Pictures Collection.

References

External links

1946 films
Films directed by William A. Seiter
American black-and-white films
Abbott and Costello films
1940s English-language films
Universal Pictures films
Films set in California
American comedy-drama films
1946 comedy-drama films
1940s American films